Prospekt Prosvescheniya (Education avenue) is a station of the Saint Petersburg Metro located between stations Ozerki and Parnas. It took its name from a nearby avenue. It was opened on 19 August 1988.

Saint Petersburg Metro stations
Railway stations in Russia opened in 1988
1988 establishments in the Soviet Union
Railway stations located underground in Russia